Usermaatre Setepenre Meryamun Ramesses VII (also written Ramses and Rameses) was the sixth pharaoh of the 20th Dynasty of Ancient Egypt. He reigned from about 1136 to 1129 BC and was the son of Ramesses VI. Other dates for his reign are 1138–1131 BC. The Turin Accounting Papyrus 1907+1908 is dated to Year 7 III Shemu day 26 of his reign and has been reconstructed to show that 11 full years passed from Year 5 of Ramesses VI to Year 7 of his reign.

Reign length
Ramesses VII's seventh year is also attested in Ostraca O. Strasbourg h 84, which is dated to II Shemu day 16 of his 7th Regnal Year. In 1980, C.J. Eyre demonstrated that a Year 8 papyrus belonged to the reign of Ramesses VII. This papyrus, P. Turin Cat. 1883 + 2095, dated to Year 8 IV Shemu day 25 (most likely Ramesses VII), details the record of the commissioning of some copper work and mentions two foremen at Deir El-Medina: Nekhemmut and Hor[mose]. The foreman Hormose was previously attested in office only during the reign of Ramesses IX while his father and predecessor in this post—a certain Ankherkhau—served in office from the second decade of the reign of Ramesses III through to Year 4 of Ramesses VII, where he is shown acting with Nekhemmut and the scribe Horisheri. The new Year 8 papyrus proves that Hormose succeeded to his father's office as foreman by Year 8 of Ramesses VII. Dominique Valbelle regards C.J. Eyre's attribution of this document to Ramesses VII as uncertain since the chief workman Hormose was previously only securely attested in office in Years 6 and 7 of Ramesses IX instead. However, this papyrus clearly bears the cartouche of Usermaatre Setepenre—the prenomen of Ramesses VII—at its beginning whereas the royal name of Ramesses IX was Neferkare—which rules out Ramesses IX as the king whose Year 8 is recorded in the P. Turin 1883 + 2095 document. The presence of Hormose's contemporary—the foreman Nekhemmut—also establishes that this papyrus dates to the mid-20th dynasty--most probably to the reign of Ramesses VII, since Nekhemmut is attested in office "from the second year of Ramesses IV until the seventeenth year of Ramesses IX."

Since Ramesses VII's accession is known to have occurred around the end of III Peret, the king would have ruled Egypt for a minimum period of 7 years and 5 months when this document was drawn up provided that it belonged to his reign as seems probable from the royal name given in the papyrus. The respected German Egyptologist Jürgen von Beckerath also accepts C.J. Eyre's evidence that Year 8 IV Shemu day 25 was Ramesses VII's highest known date. However, the accession date of his successor, Ramesses VIII, has been fixed by Amin Amer to an 8-month period between I Peret day 2 and I Akhet day 13, or 5 months after the Year 8 IV Shemu day 25 date of Ramesses VII. Therefore, if Ramesses VII did not die between the short 2 week period between IV Shemu day 29 to I Akhet 13, this pharaoh would have been on the throne for at least another 4 more months until I Peret day 2 and ruled Egypt for 7 years and 9 months when he died (perhaps slightly longer if he died after I Peret day 2). Therefore, it is possible that Ramesses VII could have ruled Egypt for almost 8 years; at present, his certain reign length is 7 years and 5 months.

Very little is known about his reign, though it was evidently a period of some turmoil, as grain prices soared.

Ramesses VII's tomb and funerary equipment
Ramesses VII was buried in Tomb KV1 upon his death. His mummy has never been found, though four cups inscribed with the pharaoh's name were found in the "royal cache" in DB320 along with the remains of other pharaohs.

References

Further reading
 K. A. Kitchen, Ramses VII and the Twentieth Dynasty, Journal of Egyptian Archaeology 58 (1972), 182-194
 Benoît Lurson, A Monument of Ramses VII in the area of the Ramesseum?, Journal of Egyptian Archaeology 98 (2012), 297-304

External links 

 

 
12th-century BC Pharaohs
Pharaohs of the Twentieth Dynasty of Egypt
1120s BC deaths
Year of birth unknown
Ramesses VI